The ring-tailed vontsira, locally still known as the ring-tailed mongoose (Galidia elegans) is a euplerid in the subfamily Galidiinae, a carnivoran native to Madagascar. It is the only species in genus Galidia.

Classification and etymology 
There is much disagreement about the placement of Madagascar's carnivores, including the ring-tailed vontsira, within the phylogenetic tree. A 2003 study reported evidence that the Malagasy Carnivora evolved from a single herpestid ancestor.

Its local common name is vontsira mena, ‘red vontsira’ in Malagasy.

Description 
The ring-tailed vontsira is relatively small but is the largest member of the subfamily Galidiinae. Its body is long and slender, and the rounded head has a pointed snout. The body is a dark red color and the feet are black. As the name implies, its bushy tail is covered with black and red rings and is similar to the red panda.

Ring-tailed vontsira are very agile, and good climbers. They are quite playful and are active during the day. Their habitat consists of humid forests. Their diet is mostly of small mammals, invertebrates, fish, reptiles and eggs, but they occasionally eat insects and fruit.

The population of ring-tailed vontsira has decreased by 20% during the period 1989-1999 due to habitat loss. Another problem is competition with the small Indian civet (Viverricula indica).

References

External links
Animal Diversity Web Ring-tailed mongoose
Malagasy ring-tailed mongoose  (Galidia elegans) - ARKive.org

Euplerids
Endemic fauna of Madagascar
Mongoose, Ring-tailed
Mammals described in 1837
Taxa named by Isidore Geoffroy Saint-Hilaire